Abdul Qawi is am a Islamic cleric and controversial personality from Multan, Punjab, Pakistan. He joined the Pakistan Tehreek-e-Insaf (PTI) political party in 2013, but was later expelled from the party. He is a former president of religious affairs of the Pakistan Tehreek-e-Insaf party in Punjab.

Controversy

Suspension from Pakistan Tehreek-e-Insaf 
Mufti Qawi's basic membership was suspended and he was later expelled from the Pakistan Tehreek-e-Insaf due to the controversy surrounding the selfies he posed for with the late model Qandeel Baloch (1990–2016). Mufti Qawi's first  encounter with Qandeel was through television where Qawi was invited as preacher to guide Qandeel in the Islamic way about her acts on social media. In same program, Qawi requested Qandeel Baloch for a meeting. After some time, Qandeel visited his house and met him personally. After this, Qandeel uploaded a video which was recorded in hotel room during their meeting, in which Qandeel was sitting very close to Qawi. She had an arm over his shoulder and revealed that he was smoking during Ramadan. After the video went viral, Qawi was criticized for his behavior, which eventually led to his ousting from his prominent position at PTI.

Suspension from Ruet-e-hilal committee 
On 22 June 2016, Mufti Qawi was suspended from the Ruet-e-Hilal Committee due to his aforementioned meeting with the late model Qandeel Baloch.

Nomination in model Qandeel Baloch’s murder case 
Mufti Abdul Qawi's name has been nominated in social media activist and model Qandeel Baloch's murder case. His name was mentioned in the First information report (FIR) on application of Qandeel's father Azeem. but was later released. He was already being investigated by Multan police.

'Halal' alcohol controversy 
In May 2020, he was criticized for his statement on alcohol permissibility when he said that drink with less than 40% alcohol is halal. Mufti Naeem, A prominent cleric and ex-chief of Jamia Binoria Karachi, lashed out at Mufti Qavi, described him as a man with a notorious reputation and dismissed his views as not in line with the views of scholars of any other sect.

Harassment Allegations 
In January 2021, Hareem Shah claimed that she and her cousin beat up Mufti Abdul Qavi over ‘dirty’, ‘vulgar’ conversation and for “physically harassing” them. The title of 'Mufti' was later withdrawn from Abdul Qavi after this incident by his uncle Maulana Abdul Wahid.

References

Pakistan Tehreek-e-Insaf politicians
People from Multan
Living people
Year of birth missing (living people)